Davide Sangiorgi is an Italian professor of computer science at the University of Bologna. 
He has previously held research positions at the University of Edinburgh and at Inria.
He has received his PhD from the University of Edinburgh under the supervision of Robin Milner in 1993. 
He has had visiting positions at Centrum Wiskunde & Informatica (CWI, Amsterdam), University of Cambridge, University of Oxford.

His research interests are in the fields of concurrent systems, semantics and verification techniques.

He is a member, and past chairman, of IFIP Working Group 2.2 on the formal description of programming concepts, and a member of Academia Europaea. He is the head of the Research Team FOCUS, a joint laboratory between the University of Bologna and INRIA.

External links

Davide Sangiorgi's home page
 Curriculum vitae

References 

Living people
1931 births
Italian computer scientists
Alumni of the University of Edinburgh
Academic staff of the University of Bologna